Filiberto Colon (born 23 June 1964) is a Puerto Rican former swimmer who competed in the 1984 Summer Olympics.

References

1966 births
Living people
Puerto Rican male swimmers
Male butterfly swimmers
Olympic swimmers of Puerto Rico
Pan American Games competitors for Puerto Rico
Swimmers at the 1979 Pan American Games
Swimmers at the 1983 Pan American Games
Swimmers at the 1984 Summer Olympics